The discography of Tekno, a Nigerian singer-songwriter and record producer consists of one studio album, 36 singles (including seven as featured artist), ten music videos, four promotional single, five guest appearances, produced 15 songs and 5 cameo appearance.

Albums

 Old Romance (2020)

Singles

Records produced

Music videos

As lead artist

As featured artist

References 

Discographies of Nigerian artists